Soul Donkey is the second album by the Sugarman 3, released in 2000. It was re-released in 2006 by Daptone Records. It differs somewhat from the band's previous album by focusing more on funk/jazz instrumentals.

Critical reception
The Plain Dealer deemed the album "laid-back yet percolating."

Track listing
 Soul Donkey - 3:48
 Chicken Half - 3:32
 Baby I Love You - 4:53
 Turtle Walk - 4:01
 Daisy Rides Again - 3:16
 Double Back - 4:53
 Pull My Cart - 3:41
 Mulin' Around - 3:20
 Saddle for Two - 3:12
 Out a Sight - 2:21
 So Long Donkey - 2:06

References

2000 albums